Rhyzodiastes vadiceps is a species of ground beetle in the subfamily Rhysodinae. It was described by R.T. & J.R. Bell in 1985. The exact provenance of the type specimen is not known, but it probably originates from Borneo.

References

Rhyzodiastes
Beetles described in 1985
Beetles of Asia